Theresienwiese is a station of Munich U-Bahn on the U4 and U5 line. It is the closest station to the Oktoberfest grounds on the Theresienwiese.

During Oktoberfest, the station handles 21,000 passengers per hour each direction.

See also
List of Munich U-Bahn stations

References

External links

Munich U-Bahn stations
Railway stations in Germany opened in 1984
1984 establishments in West Germany
Oktoberfest